Shikharpur may refer to:

Shikharpur, Mahakali, Nepal
Shikharpur, Narayani, Nepal
Shikarpur, Pakistan, a town in the Shikarpur District of the Pakistani province of Sindh